Girlguiding BGIFC (British Guides in Foreign Countries) is part of Girlguiding UK and is for British nationals living overseas. Administratively it is based in Commonwealth Guide Headquarters in Victoria, London. Members in this section of Girlguiding UK follow the normal programme very closely. Girls make the same promise as girls in the UK. In 2007, Girlguiding BGIFC had 3697 members, including adults and the Commissioner was Ruth Sara.

In 2004, Girlguiding BGIFC had groups in 31 countries, in places such as Prague, Dubai and Riyadh.

Girlguiding BGIFC also supports Lone Guiding. If a British girl living abroad wishes to be a member of Girlguiding UK at any age level and has no group, then she may become a lone guide. Girlguiding BGIFC's lone guides interact by post and email and are encouraged to attend the biennial camps.

Galleon badge
All Girlguiding BGIFC members wear the galleon badge on their uniform. The badge depicts a galleon sailing across the ocean. The colours of the Union Flag, red, white and blue, are all present. The ship symbolises Guiding overseas. The red cross on the white mainsail is a crusader cross, symbolising the adventurous and crusading spirit of the people who leave their home country to live and work abroad.

Originally the metal Galleon badges were hand-painted, with the country's name displayed on a scroll beneath the blue waves of the sea. Later, as BGIFC spread, individual hand painting was no longer possible and the galleon badges became mass-produced.

History

Girlguiding BGIFC traces its origins back to the 1st Peninsular Guide Company in Porto, Portugal. This company started in 1911, but was not registered until 1913.  The majority of Units have been registered since 1950, although many go back much further than this. The first Lone Unit was formed in 1985. On 1 April 1986, BGIFC was established as a Region of Girlguiding UK (now Girlguiding), similar to the nine UK Countries and Regions. This move gave BGIFC its own Commissioner, Advisers and Secretary.
In July 2017 Girlguiding BGIFC was superseded by British Girlguiding Overseas (BGO) see:*BGO Website

Biennial camp
Girlguiding BGIFC runs a biennial camp in the UK.

Counties
Girlguiding BGIFC has three Counties: Benelux and France, Cyprus and Germany. Not all Units are organised into one of these Counties.

Benelux and France
There are seven districts in the Benelux and France county, but not all Units are in one of these districts.

Cyprus
There are three districts in the Cyprus County, based around RAF Akrotiri, Episkopi Army Garrison and Nicosia. Each district has its own District Commissioner. The British Armed Forces community provides the majority of girls, but Leaders are often from the expatriate community.

Germany
In 2007, Germany had 4 Divisions, 12 Districts, 1 Senior Section, 15 Guide Units, 22 Brownie units and 18 Rainbow units, ranging from Hamburg to Munich.

See also
 Girlguiding UK

References

External links
BGIFC Website
BGO Website

Girlguiding
Overseas branches of Scouting and Guiding associations